The Voice is a reality talent show. The series is part of the franchise The Voice and is based on a similar competition format in the Netherlands, The Voice of Holland. The show is hosted by Carson Daly, with Alison Haislip serving as the backstage and social networking correspondent, and the coaches, all well-known musicians, were Christina Aguilera, CeeLo Green, Maroon 5 frontman Adam Levine and Blake Shelton. The inaugural season premiered April 26, 2011 and ended on June 29, 2011 on the live finale.

Javier Colon was announced as the winner of the inaugural season, marking Levine's first win as a coach.

Overview
The series consists of three phases: a blind audition, a battle phase and a four-week live performance shows. Four coaches each choose teams of (eight) contestants through a blind audition process. Each coach has the length of the auditioner's performance (about one minute) to decide if he or she wants that singer on his or her team; if two or more coaches want the same singer (as happened with all but one singer in the premiere episode), the artist is given an option to choose their coach. These artists will be mentored by the selected coach throughout the entire season, then compete in battle rounds followed by live performance shows and eliminations are done team-based until each coach had one artist remaining. When one remains for each coach, the four contestants compete against each other in the finale, with the winning artist receives $100,000 and a record deal with Universal Republic Records

The season's advisors for Green, Levine, Aguilera and Shelton were respectively Sia, Monica, music producer Adam Blackstone and Reba McEntire.

Auditions
Contestant auditions were held in eight cities across the United States between mid-January and mid-February 2011:
Chicago, New York, Miami, Nashville, Minneapolis, Austin, Los Angeles, and Seattle. Contestants were also allowed to submit an online applications, which ended on March 1, 2011. For the online auditions, contestants were required to sing one of ten preselected songs.

Contestants on The Voice as revealed by airing of promotional advertisements or shows were Javier Colon, Frenchie Davis, Nakia, Lukas Rossi, Cherie Oakley, and Dia Frampton.

Coaches, host, and social media correspondent

In late February 2011, NBC began announcements of the coaches for the series. First to sign on were CeeLo Green and Adam Levine (frontman for Maroon 5). Christina Aguilera came on board in early March 2011. Blake Shelton was added as the final coach on March 7, 2011.

Carson Daly was announced as the show's first host. Alison Haislip was announced as the show's "backstage online and social media correspondent" during the live shows.

Teams
Color key

Blind auditions
Color key

Episode 1 (April 26)
The coaches performed coach CeeLo's song, "Crazy" at the start of the show.

Episode 2 (May 3)

Second chance
At the conclusion of the Second Chances, only Team CeeLo had completed his full team of eight finalists, while Teams Blake and Christina recruited with seven artists and Team Adam with only six, selected artists eliminated previously were given a second chance to perform in the round.

The Battles
After the Blind Auditions, each coach had eight contestants for the Battle rounds airing over four weeks, with each week one pair of duets from each team competing for a place in the live shows. Coaches begin narrowing down the playing field by training the contestants with the help of "trusted advisors". Each episode featured four battles consisting of pairings from within each team, and each battle concluding with the respective coach eliminating one of the two contestants; the four winners for each coach advanced to the live shows.

The trusted advisors for these episodes are: Adam Blackstone for Team Adam; Reba McEntire working with Team Blake; Monica working with Team CeeLo; and Sia Furler working with Team Christina.

Color key

Live shows

Week 1 (June 7 & 13)
For the first two live shows, two teams performed on one performance show for the public votes and received the results on the following week's live show. Voting commences after the broadcast of each live show on Tuesday and stayed open until 10 AM EDT the following Monday. Results were announced on the following week's live show where the only artist with the highest votes advances, and a second artist saved by the coach from the remaining three. The first week of live shows featured Team Christina and Team Blake.

Color key

Week 2 (June 14 & 20)
Similar to the past week, voting proceeded as before—following the episode's close and continuing until 10 AM EDT June 20, two artists each teams advanced by either public vote or coach itself. The second live shows featured Team Adam and Team CeeLo.

Week 3: Semifinals (June 21 & 22)
In deciding on which artist would represent in the finale, both the coach as well as the public vote made up were given an equal say. The artist (for the team) which received a higher combined score will advance to the finals.

Week 4: Finale (June 28 & 29)
The final 4 performed on Tuesday, June 28, 2011, with the final results following on Wednesday, June 29, 2011. The four finalists each performed an original song and a duet with their coach. Katharine McPhee made an appearance during the results show to promote her upcoming television series Smash.

The final results came close as Daly reported that the scores between the top two were just 2% apart. Runner-up Dia Frampton's original song, "Inventing Shadows" topped this week's iTunes singles chart.

Note

^  The songs "Stitch by Stitch", "Inventing Shadows", "Afraid to Sleep", and "Lovesick" are all original compositions of Javier Colon, Dia Frampton, Vicci Martinez, and Beverly McClellan respectively.

Elimination chart
Color key
Artist's info

Result details

Performances by guests/coaches

The Voice Live on Tour

In the final episode, Daly announced a summer concert tour. This tour had six stops across the United States, including Los Angeles, Las Vegas, Chicago, Boston, Wallingford and New York. The tour featured the top two finalists from each team, including Javier Colon, Dia Frampton, Vicci Martinez, Beverly McClellan, Xenia, Frenchie Davis, Nakia, and Casey Weston. Out of the six dates, the New York show was a sell-out. However, as overall ticket sales were lackluster, the tour was cancelled in subsequent seasons. In 2014, the tour was resumed from June 21, 2014 to August 2, 2014, including the contestants of the fifth season, the sixth season and the first season contestant Dia Frampton.

Tour dates

Artists' appearances in other media
 Frenchie Davis was a semi-finalist on the season two of American Idol but was disqualified.
 Emily Valentine auditioned for the eighth season of American Idol under the name Emily Wynn-Hughes but was cut in the Hollywood Rounds.
 The Thompson Sisters appeared on American Juniors in 2003 as separate acts; both winning the highest prize on the show to join the American Juniors group.
 Vicci Martinez appeared on Star Search in 2003, but did not make it past the semi-finals.
Kelsey Rey auditioned for American Idol under the name Kelsey Laverack.
 Raquel Castro would later appear on the second season of Songland.

Reception

Ratings
The premiere episode, in what was seen as a relative surprise, was the most watched telecast on the night it aired, garnering more viewers than high-profile competitors Dancing with the Stars on ABC (in persons 18 to 49; DWTS had more overall viewers) and Glee on Fox. The series debut garnered 11.775 million viewers from 9 to 11 p.m. It peaked at 10:45 p.m. with 13.398 million viewers (live+SD).

Critical response
Rolling Stone's Mallika Rao said of the show's premiere episode, "Could this concept be the best Dutch import since tulips and Eddie Van Halen?" Despite a high viewership in its debut, the show has received mixed reviews on Metacritic, which holds at a 58.

References
Specific

General

Season 01
2011 American television seasons